Ciudad Deportiva de Lanzarote (literally Sports City of Lanzarote) is a sports ground in Arrecife, the capital of Lanzarote in the Canary Islands. It is the home ground for the island's main football team, UD Lanzarote. It holds around 7000 spectators and also hosts other sports.

External links
 Estadios de España 

Buildings and structures in Lanzarote
Football venues in the Canary Islands
Sport in Lanzarote
Arrecife